In course of the Qi coup d'état of 860 BC Duke Hu of Qi was overthrown and killed by a rebel faction, led by his half-brother Shan. As Hu had been appointed and supported by the Zhou dynasty, the coup led to a royal punitive expedition that failed in removing Shan from the throne. Later known as Duke Xian, Shan went on to rule Qi for seven or eight years.

History 
In 862 BC, King Yi of Zhou summoned the many regional vassal rulers, among them Duke Ai of Qi, to the royal capital. At the conference, the duke was slandered by the ruler of the neighbouring state Ji, which led King Yi to have Ai executed by boiling him in a huge caldron. The king then appointed Ai's half-brother Jing, subsequently known as Duke Hu, as the new ruler of Qi. Due to his ancestry and the nature of his rise to power, Duke Hu's reign appears to have suffered from legitimacy issues; especially because another, full brother of Ai, Shan, resented and challenged Duke Hu's rule.

Perhaps due of his shaky power base and strained relationship with the rest of the ducal family, Duke Hu moved his seat from the old capital Yingqiu to the city of Pugu. This move, however, alienated the citizens of Yingqiu, who consequently began to support Shan's plot to usurp the throne. Shan made his move in 860 BC, leading his followers and the people of Yingqiu in a surprise attack against Duke Hu, defeating and killing him. According to a later account, Hu was personally drowned by a Grand Master of Qi named Tsou Ma-hsü in the Chü River near Pugu. Shan then ascended the throne, and became known as Duke Xian. This coup, however, provoked a confrontation with the Zhou dynasty that had appointed the late Duke Hu as ruler of their choice.

Based on the inscriptions of the "Fifth Year Shi Shi gui", several sinologists such as Shirakawa Shizuka, Edward L. Shaughnessy, and Li Feng have concluded that King Yi sent a punitive expedition under Shi Shi against Qi to remove the usurper Duke Xian from the throne in 860 BC. Since the latter continued to rule for another seven or eight years, Li Feng believes that the Zhou campaign failed and that the royal army possibly suffered "a humiliating defeat [...] at the hands of the regional [Qi] troops". After securing his rule, Duke Xian then proceeded to banish the late Duke Hu's sons from Qi in 859 BC and moved the ducal capital back to Yingqiu, from then on known as Linzi.

Aftermath 
Li Feng considers the coup d'état of 860 BC as symptomatic for the increasing weakness and domestic disorder of the Zhou dynasty after King Mu's rule, as the dynasty not only came into conflict with some of its formerly staunchest allies and most loyal vassals, but also failed to dislodge anti-Zhou rebels. On the other side, the conflict between the lines of Duke Hu and Duke Xian did not end in 859 BC, as one of Hu's sons led a revolt against Duke Li of Qi, grandson of Xian, in 816 BC. In course of the fighting, both the duke as well as the rebel leader died, and Li's son Duke Wen of Qi eventually emerged victorious.

References

Bibliography 

Zhou dynasty
9th century BC
9th century BC in China
Qi (state)
Military coups in China
9th-century BC conflicts
Rebellions in ancient history
Wars involving the Zhou dynasty
9th-century BC coups d'état and coup attempts